Kelijeh (also Romanized as Kelījeh; also known as Golījeh) is a village in Akhtachi-ye Gharbi Rural District, in the Central District of Mahabad County, West Azerbaijan Province, Iran. At the 2006 census, its population was 682, in 125 families.

References 

Populated places in Mahabad County